The 1923 Cincinnati Bearcats football team was an American football team that represented the University of Cincinnati as a member of the Ohio Athletic Conference during the 1923 college football season. In their second season under head coach George McLaren, the Bearcats compiled a 6–3 record (5–2 against conference opponents). Red Prather was the team captain. The team played its home games at Carson Field in Cincinnati.

Schedule

References

Cincinnati
Cincinnati Bearcats football seasons
Cincinnati Bearcats football